Néstor Kirchner was the president of Argentina from 2003 to 2007. The name may also make reference to:
 The 2010–11 Argentine Primera División season (named "Torneo Clausura Néstor Kirchner")
 The Néstor Kirchner Cultural Centre
 The Néstor Kirchner Dam